The following events occurred in July 1924:

July 1, 1924 (Tuesday)
Japan held a national day of protest of the United States' Immigration Act the day it went into effect. Mass prayer meetings were conducted at Shinto shrines all over the country and an unknown Japanese man cut down the American flag at the U.S. embassy in Tokyo. The Japanese government gave the United States a formal note of regret over the flag theft. 
At the Democratic National Convention, William Gibbs McAdoo lost ground in balloting as Al Smith and John W. Davis steadily gained.

July 2, 1924 (Wednesday)
The American flag stolen from the embassy in Tokyo was recovered and the Akasaka district's chief of police resigned over the incident.
Inventor Guglielmo Marconi addressed the Royal Society of Arts in London describing his new beam system of short-wave wireless transmission. Marconi said this system could transmit more words per day between distant countries than was possible before, and more economically as well, resulting in a general reduction in telegraphic rates. 
Italian border patrollers shot and killed two Serbian soldiers and wounded a civilian bystander at the Serbian boundary line.
Portuguese Prime Minister Álvaro de Castro fought a sword duel with Flight Captain Ribeiro over a political dispute. Ribiero was wounded in the arm.

July 3, 1924 (Thursday)
A 21-year-old man was arrested in Osaka for stealing the flag from the American embassy. He explained his action by saying he wanted to do something "heroic" before he died for his country.
U.S. Secretary of Commerce Herbert Hoover submitted a paper before the World Power Conference in Wembley, London urging America's power plants to be linked together to save energy.
Born: Michael Barrington, actor, in Shropshire, England (d. 1988); S. R. Nathan, president of Singapore, in Singapore (d. 2016)

July 4, 1924 (Friday)
A new American political party called the Progressive Party opened a convention in Cleveland to nominate Wisconsin Senator Robert M. La Follette as a third-party candidate for U.S. president.
Kitty McKane Godfree of the United Kingdom defeated the American Helen Wills in the Women's Singles Final at the Wimbledon Championships of tennis.
Glacier National Park concessions worker Donald T. Fly drowned in Saint Mary Lake.
Calvin Coolidge, Jr. was reported to be seriously ill.
Born: Eva Marie Saint, actress, in Newark, New Jersey

July 5, 1924 (Saturday)
The official opening ceremonies for the Summer Olympics were conducted at Colombes Stadium in Paris, France. Germany was absent for the second consecutive Olympics, having not been invited by the Organizing Committee.
Jean Borotra defeated fellow Frenchman René Lacoste in the Men's Singles Final at Wimbledon.
A group of Brazilian army officers mounted a rebellion in São Paulo and Rio Grande do Sul. 
Born: Niels Jannasch, German-Canadian historian, in Holzminden, Germany (d. 2001); Osman Lins, fiction writer, in Vitória de Santo Antão, Brazil (d. 1978); János Starker, cellist, in Budapest, Hungary (d. 2013)

July 6, 1924 (Sunday)
A general election was held in Mexico. Plutarco Elías Calles of the Laborist Party won the presidential election with 84.1% of the vote.
Ville Ritola of Finland won gold in the 10,000m race at the Paris Olympics. Paavo Nurmi, the greatest long-distance runner at the time, had hoped to break a record in the event but Finnish officials refused to enter him in it because they feared for his health if he competed in too many events, a decision that angered Nurmi.

July 7, 1924 (Monday)
Calvin Coolidge Jr. died at 10:30 in the morning with his parents by his bedside.
Al Smith passed William Gibbs McAdoo in balloting at the Democratic National Convention before it adjourned early out of respect for the President.
Born: Benedikt Gröndal, Prime Minister of Iceland (d. 2010)
Died: Calvin Coolidge, Jr., 16, son of U.S. president Calvin Coolidge, died of blood poisoning caused by an infection.

July 8, 1924 (Tuesday)
The Communist International in Moscow condemned the U.S. Immigration Act and passed a resolution advocating unrestricted worldwide immigration.

July 9, 1924 (Wednesday)
Little-known former congressman John W. Davis of West Virginia became the surprise winner at the Democratic National Convention, securing the presidential nomination on the 103rd ballot as something of a compromise candidate. Charles W. Bryan of Nebraska earned the nomination for vice president. William Gibbs McAdoo withdrew reluctantly and ungraciously, leaving the Democrats bitterly divided heading into the general campaign.
A funeral was held for Calvin Coolidge, Jr. in Washington, D.C. Flags were half-masted and all nonessential government offices closed at 3:30 p.m.
The aviators trying to circumnavigate the globe flew from Baghdad to Aleppo.

July 10, 1924 (Thursday)
Finnish runner Paavo Nurmi performed one of the greatest feats in Olympic history when he won the 1,500m race and the 5,000m race two hours apart.
Calvin Coolidge, Jr. was buried at the Plymouth Notch Cemetery in Vermont.

July 11, 1924 (Friday)
The World Energy Council was formed in London.
Born: Brett Somers, actress, singer and comedian, in Saint John, New Brunswick, Canada (d. 2007); Charlie Tully, footballer, in Belfast, Northern Ireland (d. 1971)

July 12, 1924 (Saturday)
Paavo Nurmi won the 10,000m cross-country race at the Olympics and then helped to win another gold medal for Finland in the team event. The races were held in blistering heat of 45 degrees Celsius; cross-country races were never an event at the Olympics again because of the number of runners collapsing from heat exhaustion.  
The airmen attempting to be the first to fly around the world landed in Bucharest from Constantinople.
The original trademark application for Kleenex was filed by Kimberly-Clark Corporation.

July 13, 1924 (Sunday)
The Rex Ingram-directed film The Arab opened at the Capitol Theatre in New York City.
Born: Carlo Bergonzi, operatic tenor, in Polesine, Italy (d. 2014); Johnny Gilbert, television host. Currently the announcer for Jeopardy!, in Newport News, Virginia (alive in 2021)

July 14, 1924 (Monday)
35 were reported dead in forest fires in Washingtom, California, Idaho and British Columbia.
The aviators attempting to be the first to fly around the world reached Paris, circling over the Arc de Triomphe.
Died: Isabella Ford, 69, English socialist, feminist, trade unionist and writer; Isabella Stewart Gardner, 84, American art collector and philanthropist

July 15, 1924 (Tuesday)
The British and Italian governments signed an agreement on the Jubba River in Africa as the British ceded their territory on the northern side - it became Italian Trans-Juba. 
The Irish Free State released Éamon de Valera and other political prisoners. 
The United States Army suspended recruitment after reaching an enlistment strength of 123,793, in excess of the number authorized by Congress which was not to far exceed 120,000.
Born: Makhmud Esambayev, dancer and actor, in Starye Atagi, Chechen Autonomous Oblast, Soviet Union (d. 2000)

July 16, 1924 (Wednesday)
The London Reparations Conference opened to arrange for the implementation of the Dawes Plan.
The airmen trying to make the first aerial circumnavigation of the globe flew from Paris to London.

July 17, 1924 (Thursday)
Jesse Haines pitched a no-hitter for the St. Louis Cardinals in a 5–0 win over the Boston Braves.

July 18, 1924 (Friday)
U.S. Vice Consul Robert Imbrie was beaten to death by an angry mob in Tehran, Iran after he photographed a gathering at a sacred watering place where a miracle was said to have taken place. Police were slow to help because they were intimidated by the soldiers of the Cossack Brigade, the real authority in Iran, who were participating in the attack. Imbrie's companion Allen Dulles survived the beating.

July 19, 1924 (Saturday)
The Napalpí massacre occurred in Argentina when 400 indigenous Toba people were killed by Argentine police and ranchers.
Montana Senator Burton K. Wheeler was announced as the vice presidential nominee of the Progressive Party and running mate of presidential nominee Robert M. La Follette. 
Born: Stanley K. Hathaway, politician, in Osceola, Nebraska (d. 2005); Pat Hingle, actor, in Miami, Florida (d. 2009)

July 20, 1924 (Sunday)
Tehran was put under martial law due to high tensions over the death of Robert Imbrie.
Ottavio Bottecchia of Italy won the Tour de France.
The Soviet sports newspaper Sovetsky Sport was founded.
Born: Tatyana Lioznova, film director, in Moscow, Soviet Union (d. 2011)

July 21, 1924 (Monday)
The Leopold and Loeb trial began as defense lawyer Clarence Darrow told the Illinois court that his clients were entering pleas of guilty.
Born: Don Knotts, actor, in Morgantown, West Virginia (d. 2006)

July 22, 1924 (Tuesday)
Paris Olympics organizer Pierre de Coubertin lashed back at criticism of the games, calling the Paris press guilty of "magnifying the unpleasant incidents instead of fulfilling its duty and educating the people to a big sport ideal." He also said it was "idiotic" of the French government to build Colombes Stadium so far outside of Paris without the proper transportation facilities. Some of the unfortunate incidents referred to included the French booing of the American flag at a rugby match and complaints over accommodations in the tennis tournament.
Japan passed an amendment to its Nationality Law so that Japanese children born in the United States and other jus soli countries would automatically lose their Japanese nationality unless it was expressly retained within fourteen days of birth. The amendment also allowed dual citizens in those countries to easily renounce their Japanese citizenship.
Died: Albert Bruce-Joy, 81, Irish sculptor

July 23, 1924 (Wednesday)
20 children were trampled to death and 17 injured as patrons fled a movie house in Veracruz, Mexico when the film caught fire.
The judge in the Leopold and Loeb case fully explained to the defendants the consequences of pleading guilty and asked them to confirm their plea, which they did. The trial now became a question of whether or not the killers would receive the death penalty. 
Died: Frank Frost Abbott, 84, American classical scholar

July 24, 1924 (Thursday)
Light heavyweight boxing champion Gene Tunney defeated Georges Carpentier by technical knockout at the beginning of the fifteenth round at the Polo Grounds in New York.
Died: Palmer Cox, 84, Canadian illustrator and author

July 25, 1924 (Friday)
The new issue of Workers' Weekly, the newspaper of the Communist Party of Great Britain, included a provocative article entitled "An Open Letter to the Fighting Forces" which included passages such as, "Neither in a class war nor in a military war, will you turn your guns on your fellow workers", and, "Turn your weapons on your oppressors." The question of whether to charge editor John Ross Campbell with incitement to mutiny became a controversial issue known as the Campbell Case.   
Greece announced it was expelling 50,000 Armenians from the country.
American League president Ban Johnson ordered umpires to speed up baseball games by cutting short trivial arguments about balls and strikes as well as preventing players from taking too much time inspecting balls on suspicion they'd been tampered with.
Born: Frank Church, politician, in Boise, Idaho (d. 1984)

July 26, 1924 (Saturday)
The Ku Klux Klan staged a huge rally in Issaquah, Washington, drawing at least 13,000.

July 27, 1924 (Sunday)
The closing ceremonies of the Summer Olympics were conducted at Colombes Stadium in Paris. The United States led the final medal count with 45 gold medals.
The Tarlis incident occurred when a Greek officer killed 17 Bulgarian peasants near the Greco-Bulgarian border.
Died: Ferruccio Busoni, 58, Italian pianist and composer

July 28, 1924 (Monday)
Many deaths were reported in southern India due to flooding. 
Ljubomir Davidović became Prime Minister of Yugoslavia.
Born: Anne Braden, civil rights activist, in Louisville, Kentucky (d. 2006)

July 29, 1924 (Tuesday)
The practicality of airmail was demonstrated for the public when the U.S. Army air service carried a cargo of mail from Nashville, Tennessee to Chicago in 2 hours and 29 minutes.
Germany and the Soviet Union signed a trade agreement which ended the two-month standoff over the Berlin police raid.
Born: Lloyd Bochner, actor, in Toronto, Canada (d. 2005); Lillian Faralla, baseball player, in San Pedro, California (d. 2019); Robert Horton, actor, in Los Angeles (d. 2016); Elizabeth Short, murder victim known as the Black Dahlia, in Hyde Park, Boston, Massachusetts (d. 1947)

July 30, 1924 (Wednesday)
The state rested in the Leopold and Loeb trial.
The round-the-world flyers reached Kirkwall in the Orkney Islands.
Died: Arthur McCabe, 37, Australian rugby player (heart attack)

July 31, 1924 (Thursday)
The reparations commission released a report estimating that Germany had only paid about half the amounts that the French, Belgians and English demanded for occupying the Rhineland and Ruhr.
Died: Prince Francis Joseph of Battenberg, 62

References

1924
1924-07
1924-07